Orbivestus albocinerascens is a plant in the family Asteraceae, native to East Africa.

Description
The capitula feature white flowers. The fruits are achenes.

Distribution and habitat
Orbivestus albocinerascens is native to Kenya, Tanzania and Uganda.

References

Vernonieae
Flora of East Tropical Africa
Plants described in 1988